Cressey Peak is a peak,  high, located  east of the Harold Byrd Mountains between the southeast edge of the Ross Ice Shelf and the Watson Escarpment. It was mapped by the United States Geological Survey from ground surveys and from U.S. Navy air photos, 1960–63, and named by the Advisory Committee on Antarctic Names for Richard N. Cressey, a storekeeper with the Byrd Station winter party in 1958.

References 

Mountains of Marie Byrd Land